The Killing Kind is the eighth studio album released by thrash metal band Overkill in 1996. It was the first album to feature new guitarists Joe Comeau and Sebastian Marino, and was released on CMC International, whereas their previous studio albums were released by either Megaforce or Atlantic Records.

Overview
In 1995, both guitarists Rob Cannavino and Merritt Gant decided to leave Overkill. Overkill then hired Joe Comeau, former singer of the band Liege Lord (now playing guitar). Comeau brought along former Anvil guitarist Sebastian Marino, with whom he had worked with in the past. This new line up recorded The Killing Kind in 1995. It was self-produced and mixed by Chris Tsangarides (Judas Priest, Helloween).

While staying well within the thrash genre, the album was a departure from its predecessor's more traditional thrash metal style and featured many modern elements, such as hardcore and groove metal, while vocally some influences were drawn from outside the rock and metal genres. Since Comeau was also a singer, backing vocals on The Killing Kind and subsequent albums were more elaborate and frequent than before, adding another new element to the band's sound.

Reception 
Press response to The Killing Kind was positive. However, the fan's response to The Killing Kind was split, with some fans regarding it to be one of their worst albums and other fans calling it one of their finest efforts.

Touring 
Overkill toured Europe twice in support of The Killing Kind, first in February 1996 with Megora and Accu§er, and then again in November with Anvil and Stahlhammer.

Track listing
 All tracks written by Bobby "Blitz" Ellsworth and D.D. Verni.

Personnel
 Bobby "Blitz" Ellsworth – lead vocals
 D.D. Verni – bass, backing vocals
 Sebastian Marino – lead guitar
 Joe Comeau – rhythm guitar, backing vocals
 Tim Mallare – drums

Details
 Recorded September – October, 1995 at Carriage House Studio, Stamford, Connecticut
 Produced by Overkill
 Mixed by Chris Tsangarides and Overkill
 Engineered by Andy Katz, John Montagnese, and Phil Magnotti
 Mastered by Howie Weinberg at Masterdisc, New York City

Sampling
 The audio samples for the song "Battle" were taken from the feature film, Batman Returns. The dialog is from a scene between Selina Kyle (Michelle Pfeiffer) and Max Shreck (Christopher Walken).

References

External links
 Official OVERKILL Site

Overkill (band) albums
1996 albums
CMC International albums